Louisiana held its election July 4–6, 1814.

See also 
 United States House of Representatives elections, 1814 and 1815
 List of United States representatives from Louisiana

Notes 

1814
Louisiana
United States House of Representatives